Andorinha Sport Club is a football club that plays in the São Tomé and Príncipe Championship.  The team is based in the neighbourhood of Ponta Mina near Praia Cruz in the island of São Tomé.

History
The club was founded in 1931 and is one of the oldest sport clubs in the nation.

The team won their first colonial title in the 1938, in 1970, Andorinha won five straight provincial titles. Andorinha won their last provincial title in 1973, two years before São Tomé and Príncipe gained independence.

1968/69 season.  In 1984, Andorinha won their first title after independence and is the fourth team in history to do so and is the only title won by the team.

In 1981, the club celebrated its 50th anniversary, in 2006, it celebrated its 75th anniversary of foundation.

Andorinha was finished and deprived of continuing in the island Premier Division in 2010, the club competed in the second division between 2011 and 2014 until they were deprived of continuing after being in the last two places and since 2015, Andorinha competes in the third division.

Stadium
Estádio Nacional 12 de Julho is a multi-use stadium in São Tomé, São Tomé and Príncipe.  It is currently used mostly for football matches.  The stadium holds 6,500.  Its address is Avenidas das Nações Unidas.  The stadium is home to the three best football clubs in the nation and the island including Sporting Praia Cruz, Aliança Nacional, Andorinha and Vitória Riboque.

The club also trains and practices at the stadium.

Logo and uniform
Its logo features a white crest (of the neighbourhood) with ASC on top then left and right.  Its home uniform are colored blue with a yellow short.

Honours
São Tomé and Príncipe Championships: 8
Before independence: 7
1938, 1965, 1967, 1968, 1968/69, 1970, 1973
Since independence: 1
1984

São Tomé and Príncipe Cup: 3
Before independence:
1960, 1967, 1970

São Tomé Island League: 8
Before independence: 7
1938, 1965, 1967, 1968, 1968/69, 1970, 1973
Since independence: 1
1984

League and cup history

Positions
10th (2015) - Third Division

Statistics
Best position: 1st (national)
Appearances at the National Championships:
National: 1

References

External links
Blog of Andorinha Sporting Club, by Alvaro Nogueira, former player of team 

 
Football clubs in São Tomé and Príncipe
Sport in São Tomé
São Tomé Island Third Division
1931 establishments in São Tomé and Príncipe
Association football clubs established in 1931